The canton of Châteaurenard is an administrative division of the Bouches-du-Rhône department, in southeastern France. At the French canton reorganisation which came into effect in March 2015, it was expanded from 6 to 15 communes. Its seat is in Châteaurenard.

It consists of the following communes: 

Barbentane
Boulbon
Cabannes
Châteaurenard
Eyragues
Graveson
Maillane
Mollégès
Noves
Plan-d'Orgon
Rognonas
Saint-Andiol
Saint-Pierre-de-Mézoargues
Tarascon
Verquières

References

Cantons of Bouches-du-Rhône